Jan Gielens (17 August 1903 – 26 July 1964) was a Dutch footballer. He played in nine matches for the Netherlands national football team from 1925 to 1926.

References

External links
 

1903 births
1964 deaths
Dutch footballers
Netherlands international footballers
Place of birth missing
Association footballers not categorized by position